Luc Fortin is a Canadian politician in Quebec, who was elected to the National Assembly of Quebec in the 2014 election. He represented the electoral district of Sherbrooke as a member of the Quebec Liberal Party.

He served in the Couillard Cabinet as the Minister of Culture and Communications.

Electoral Record

References

Quebec Liberal Party MNAs
Living people
French Quebecers
Politicians from Sherbrooke
21st-century Canadian politicians
Members of the Executive Council of Quebec
Year of birth missing (living people)